Gibbula deversa is a species of sea snail, a marine gastropod mollusk in the family Trochidae, the top snails.

Description

Distribution
This species occurs in the Northern Atlantic Ocean.

References

 Milaschewitch K. O., 1916: Molliuski cernego i Azovoskogo" Morei Fauna Rossi i koprelnih stran 5-12 pp. 312.
 Gofas, S.; Le Renard, J.; Bouchet, P. (2001). Mollusca, in: Costello, M.J. et al. (Ed.) (2001). European register of marine species: a check-list of the marine species in Europe and a bibliography of guides to their identification''. Collection Patrimoines Naturels, 50: pp. 180–213

deversa
Gastropods described in 1916